The Uphill Path is a 1918 silent film drama directed by James Kirkwood and starring Catherine Calvert.

It was filmed at the old Biograph Studios. Working title for this film was : The Girl with a Past.

The creator of the story Paul Armstrong, had been married to Catherine Calvert. Armstrong had died in 1915.

Cast
Catherine Calvert - Ruth Travers
Guy Coombs - Daniel Clarkson
Dudley Ayers - Chadwick Blake
Frank Beamish - Howard Mason
Charles Craig - Gilbert Hilton
Russell Simpson - James Lawton
Dorothy Dunn - Cecily Lawton
Winona Bridges - Mrs. Clarkson
Gene Lenot - Mrs. Blake

Preservation status
 A print is preserved in the Library of Congress Packard Campus for Audio-Visual Conservation collection.

References

External links
 The Uphill Path at IMDb.com

1918 films
American silent feature films
Films directed by James Kirkwood Sr.
American black-and-white films
1910s English-language films
1918 drama films
1910s American films
Silent American drama films